is a railway station located in the city of Kitaakita, Akita Prefecture, Japan, operated by the third sector railway operator Akita Nairiku Jūkan Railway.

Lines
Aikawa Station is served by the Nariku Line, and is located 9.7 km from the terminus of the line at Takanosu Station.

Station layout
The station consists of one island platform connected to the station building by a level crossing. The station is unattended.

Platforms

Adjacent stations

History
The line was extended on to Aniai Station by September 25, 1936. The station was renamed to its present name on April 1, 1956. The line was privatized on November 1, 1986, becoming the Akita Nairiku Jūkan Railway.

Surrounding area
 Aikawa Post Office
 former Aikawa Town Hall

External links

 Nairiku Railway Station information 

Railway stations in Japan opened in 1934
Railway stations in Akita Prefecture
Kitaakita